David Verser (born March 1, 1958) is a former American football wide receiver in the National Football League.

Career
He played football at the University of Kansas, where, during his senior year, he led the Jayhawks in receiving with 21 receptions for 463 yards and five touchdowns. He earned a degree in social work.

Verser was selected in the first round by the Cincinnati Bengals in the 1981 NFL Draft. He had 23 receptions in four seasons as a backup receiver. In 1981, he caught six passes for 161 yards (26.8 yards per catch) and scored two touchdowns, and he returned 29 kicks for 691 yards, a 23.8 average.  In the 1981 AFC championship game, known as the Freezer Bowl, he had a 40-yard kickoff return that set up a Bengals touchdown. He played in Super Bowl XVI, which the Bengals lost to the San Francisco 49ers, 26-21, but had a dismal performance returning 5 kickoffs for just 52 yards.  He also infamously missed a blocking audible that contributed to a failed 4th and goal conversion attempt from the 49ers 1-yard line.

During the 1982 through 1984 seasons, Verser was a backup wide receiver and kick returner for the Bengals.

After the 1985 NFL Draft, he was traded to the Green Bay Packers and later signed with the Tampa Bay Buccaneers, for whom he played one game and returned four kicks in 1985. He was out of football in 1986, and in 1987 played two games for the Cleveland Browns, with one rush for nine yards.  He finished his NFL career with 65 kickoff returns for 1,371 yards, and 23 receptions for 451 yards and three touchdowns.  He also had 8 carries for 51 yards.

After leaving football and with a degree in social work, he became a social worker, worked for the Hamilton County, Ohio Juvenile Court, then he became a police officer with the Cincinnati Police Department. He retired from the department after 12 years.

References

1958 births
Living people
Sportspeople from Kansas City, Kansas
American football wide receivers
Kansas Jayhawks football players
Cincinnati Bengals players
Tampa Bay Buccaneers players
Cleveland Browns players
University of Kansas alumni